Alpkäse is a type of cheese made with cow milk in the Alpine region (Austria, Italy, Switzerland, Germany). It is classified as a Swiss-type or Alpine cheese.

The origin of this type of cheese is associated with the Alps located in Germany and Austria. Emmental in nature like its cousin the Swiss cheese, it is featured with tiny holes known as 'teardrops". Similar to the majority of hard/semi-hard cheese, the more it is matured, the more flavour it develops. The alpkäse cheese from Trentino Alto Adige is made from cow milk. Some of those cheese varieties, exceeding 60 products, native to that place include Asiago Antico Maso Rosso, Arunda, Asiago d'allevo, Asiago Mezzano cheese and Asiago Pressato Trentino cheese.

Austria 
In Austria, Alpkäse refers to a hard cheese that resembles Vorarlberger Bergkäse in taste and texture. The difference between these cheeses lies in the period and place of production. Bergkäse is produced in the low mountain range (between 600 and 1500 m) and year-round, so even in winter, when the animals are in the stables and fed with hay. Alpkäse, on the other hand, is only produced in the summer between May and September on high mountain meadows above 1500 m (Alpine pastures or alps), where the animals graze Alpine herbs. Therefore, Alpkäse is a seasonal product. An example of Austrian Alpkäse is the Vorarlberger Alpkäse or Tiroler Alpkäse both of which have been registered as PDO.

The production of Alpkäse is closely tied to the traditional farming practice of Alpine transhumance.

See also
Swiss cheeses and dairy products
List of Italian cheeses
List of Austrian cheeses

References

Cow's-milk cheeses
Italian cheeses
Austrian cheeses